Sundara Travels is a 2002 Tamil-language comedy film directed by Asokan. The film stars Murali, Radha, and Vadivelu. Vasu, Sabitha Anand, and Vinu Chakravarthy appear in supporting roles. Written by Govind Padman and Mahesh Mithra, it is a remake of their Malayalam film Ee Parakkum Thalika (2001). The music was composed by Bharani, with editing done by P. C. Mohanan. The film released on 30 August 2002.

Plot
Gopikrishna (Murali) owns an old bus which was received as compensation for his father's road accident. Gopi now faces many consequences due to the bus's pathetic condition. He had sold many valuable things to maintain this bus, and his friend Azhagu (Vadivelu) was his only companion and the bus's cleaner. A mouse had eaten Azhagu's passport and spoiled his chances of going abroad. Some part of the film's comedy involves Azhagu running behind the mouse for revenge. A live TV show in which Gopi insults the City Traffic Commissioner (Vinu Chakravarthy) lands him in more trouble when the latter commands Gopi to leave the city with the bus. His other friends, advocates, and well-wishers try to help him with a bank loan to run a mobile kitchen (Tattukada) from his bus. The plot took a turn when a girl named Vasanthi (Radha) enters the bus as a nomad, but she was actually Gayathri, the daughter of an influential and politically powerful minister (P. Vasu) in Puducherry. Her father forced her to join politics, which made her leave home. Initially, Gayathri declines to leave the bus, despite Azhagu's and Gopi's constant efforts. The police traces her and takes her back to her father's custody. Her father was making arrangements for her marriage with someone else. Meanwhile, Gopi realized that he could not live without Gayathri. Gopi and Azhagu secretly entered her house, and finally, all ended well by winning the heart of Gayathri's father.

Cast

Production
The film's shooting commenced at Kodaikanal, and held at locations in Kerala and Thenkasi.

Soundtrack

There are the 6 songs in this film composed by Bharani. The song "Kannum Kannum" was later reused as "Ding Ding" in Telugu film Siva Rama Raju.

Critical reception
Gopinath said that: "Sundara Travels is one of the best comedy movie for the 90's kids. Murali and Vadivel in Vinu chakravarthi house comedy was epic laugh riot". The Hindu wrote: "The director starts off very well but loses steam midway and presents something predictable". Bizhat wrote " On the whole this remake does not gel with Tamil film comedies which have to be made in a more slapstick way".

References

Tamil remakes of Malayalam films
2002 films
2000s Tamil-language films
Indian comedy films
Films shot in Kerala
Films shot in Kodaikanal
2002 comedy films